Dreddlocked (1993) is an original novel written by Stephen Marley and based on the long-running British science fiction comic strip Judge Dredd.

Synopsis

When a psychic lunatic in the Undercity threatens to cause mass destruction by bringing film characters and monsters to life, Judge Dredd and private eye Mister Cairo have to team up to stop him – even though Cairo is a wanted perp who blames Dredd for the death of his mother. They also have to contend with rogue elements in the Special Judicial Squad.

External links
Dreddlocked at the 2000 AD website.

Novels by Stephen Marley
Judge Dredd novels